Karl Graul (6 February 1814 – 10 November 1864) was a leader of Leipzig Lutheran mission and a Tamil scholar. He was born in a poor weaver family in Germany. He moved to India as the director of the Lutheran Leipzig Mission in 1849 and there he mastered Tamil.

Graul was one of the foremost figures in missiology. His approach towards caste system was considered to be too lenient by his critics since he considered that caste system would fade on its own accord and Christian organizations need not interfere with local traditions. He also advocated the supremacy of Lutheranism over other Christian denominations and found it hard to cooperate with Anglicans in India.

Early life
Karl Graul was born in Wörlitz, Duchy of Anhalt, into a poor weaver's family. In spite of his poor background he received good education in classical and modern languages as well as in theology. However, as for as mission and missiology is concerned he was entirely self-taught.

Tamil scholar
Karl Graul was appointed the director of the Lutheran Leipzig Mission in 1844. The Lutheran mission had succeeded the Danish-Hale mission in South India. During his stay in India, Graul mastered the Tamil language. After returning to Leipzig in 1853 he taught Tamil language and literature at the mission house. Later Graul wrote Bibilotheca Tamulica seu Opera Praecipua Tamuliensium (1854–1865). A work in 4 volumes, it contains in its third and fourth volumes the first complete translation of the Tirukkural in Latin, German, and the standard spoken Tamil with notes and glossaries. It was published by his student Wilhelm Germann the year after Graul's death in Erlangen. Graul also wrote a Tamil Grammar in German (1855).

Missiology
Graul being one of the foremost figures in missiology, insisted that other missionaries should go through academic training both in mission as well in theology. He insisted that the knowledge of locals with contextual approach towards indigenous churches.

Views on caste system
Graul's views on caste system was considered by his critics as "too lenient". This was in light that Madras Missionary Conference resolved that no one should be admitted to baptism until he had shed off the caste identity and breaks the caste by eating food prepared by a person from the lower caste. According to Stephen Neill all Protestant missionary societies agreed to these terms except for Graul's Leipzig Evangelical Lutheran Mission. This was since Graul, who took a “middle” standpoint and regarded the caste as “a natural kingdom lying between the divine and the demonic”, believed that caste system can be removed only as a slow process and making it mandatory is not needed. It was his view that missionaries should not interfere with indigenous social orders unless they are wholly incompatible with the Gospel.

Supremacy of Lutheranism
Graul believed in supremacy of Lutheranism over other Christian denominations. Thus he found it hard on mutual cooperation with Anglicans in India especially on communion.

Death

Graul in 1864 qualified himself as a university lecturer in missiology at Erlangen. However, he died the same year even before taking up the position.

Works
 Übersetzung von Dante Allghieri's Göttlicher Komödie; 1843. (Elektronischer Text auf www.dantealighieri.dk)
 Unterscheidungslehren der verschiedenen christlichen Bekenntnisse; 1845
 Die Ev.-Luth. Mission an die ev-luth. Kirche aller Lande; 1845
 Explanations concerning the principles of the Leipzig Society with regard to the Caste-Question; Madras 1851
 Reise nach Ostindien, 5 volumes; 1854–56
 Bibliotheca Tamulica sive Opera Praecipia Tamuliensium, 4 volumes
 Volume 1: Tamulische Schriften zur Erläuterung des Vedanta-Systems oder der rechtgläubigen Philosophie der Hindus. Übersetzung und Erklärung von Karl Graul. Leipzig 1854. (Digitalisat)
 Volume 2: Kaivaljanavanīta. A Vedanta Poem. The Tamil Text with a Translation and Glossary and Grammatical Notes. Leipzig/London 1855. (Digitalisat)
 Volume 3: Der Kural des Tiruvalluver. Ein gnomisches Gedicht über die drei Strebeziele des Menschen. Übersetzung und Erklärung von Karl Graul. Leipzig 1856. ( Digitalisat)
 Volume 4: Kural of Tiruvalluver. High-Tamil Text with Translation into Common Tamil and Latin, Notes and Glossary. Leipzig 1865. (Digitalisat)
 Outline of Tamil Grammar; 1855
 Die christliche Kirche an der Schwelle des irenäischen Zeitalters; 1860
 Die Stellung der evangelisch-lutherischen Mission in Leipzig zur ostindischen Kastenfrage; 1861
 Über Stellung und Bedeutung der christlichen Missionen im Ganzen der Universitätswissentschaften; 1864
 Indische Sinnpflanzen und Blumen zur Kennzeichnung des indischen, vornehmlich tamulischen Geistes; 1864

See also

 Tirukkural translations into German
 List of translators

Sources  
 Werner Raupp (Ed.): Mission in Quellentexten. Geschichte der Deutschen Evangelischen Mission von der Reformation bis zur Weltmissionskonferenz Edinburgh 1910, Erlangen/Bad Liebenzell 1990 (ISBN 3-87214-238-0 / 3-88002-424-3), p. 336-343 (a) Stellung der evanglisch-lutherischen Mission in Leipzig zur ostindischen Kastenfrage, 1861, p. 1-22; b) Über Stellung und Bedeutung der christlichen Missionen im Ganzen der Universitätswissentschaften, 1864, p. 4-14).

Notes

References

1814 births
1864 deaths
People from Wörlitz
People from the Duchy of Anhalt
German Lutheran missionaries
Lutheran missionaries in India
German expatriates in India
Tamil–German translators
Tamil–Latin translators
19th-century linguists
Translators of the Tirukkural into German
Translators of the Tirukkural into Latin
19th-century translators
Tirukkural translators
19th-century Lutherans
Missionary linguists